Eakkanut Kongket (born 31 March 1988) is a Thai professional footballer who plays as a right back for Thai League 1 club PT Prachuap.

References

External links
 

1988 births
Living people
Eakkanut Kongket
Eakkanut Kongket
Association football defenders
Eakkanut Kongket
Eakkanut Kongket